The 2020–21 Club América season is the club's 76th consecutive season in the top-flight of Mexican football. The team will participate in the Liga MX and the CONCACAF Champions League.

Coaching staff

Players

Squad information

Players and squad numbers last updated on 1 February 2021.Note: Flags indicate national team as has been defined under FIFA eligibility rules. Players may hold more than one non-FIFA nationality.

Pre-season
Club América preceded their 2020–21 campaign by taking part in the Copa por México, being placed in Group A alongside Toluca, UNAM, and Cruz Azul. The matches were announced in June 2020.

Transfers

Summer

In

Out

Winter

In

Out

Competitions

Overview

Liga MX

Guardianes 2020

Results by round

Guardianes 2021

Results by round

Guardianes 2020

Matches

Liguilla

Quarterfinals

Guardianes 2021

Matches

Liguilla

Quarterfinals

2020 CONCACAF Champions League 

The 2020 CONCACAF Champions League began during the 2019–20 Liga MX season, but was postponed indefinitely in March due to the COVID-19 pandemic. In November, CONCACAF announced that the remaining fixtures of the Champions League would be held the following month, and would be played at Exploria Stadium in Orlando, Florida.

América, up 3–0 on aggregate, faced Atlanta United in the second-leg of the quarter-finals.

Round of 16 
The Round of 16 was played during the 2019–20 Club América season.

Quarter-finals

Semi-finals

2021 CONCACAF Champions League

Round of 16

Quarter-finals

Notes

References 

Club América seasons
America
America